

Pualco Range Conservation Park is a protected area in the Australian state of South Australia located in the locality of Pualco Range about  south of the town of Yunta in the state's Far North region.

The conservation park was proclaimed under the National Parks and Wildlife Act 1972 in 2010 as the land "supports high value habitat for the endangered plains wanderer, a distinctive, quail-like bird, as well as other species of state conservation significance including the Major Mitchell's cockatoo, blue-winged parrot and peregrine falcon".

The conservation park is classified as an IUCN Category VI protected area.

See also
Protected areas of South Australia

References

External links
Entry for Pualco Range Conservation Park on Protected Planet

Conservation parks of South Australia
Protected areas established in 2010
2010 establishments in Australia
Far North (South Australia)